Mary Willing Clymer (1770–1852) was a noted American socialite in Philadelphia during the city's time as capital of the United States. Her portrait by Gilbert Stuart, painted in 1797, is currently displayed at the Chicago Art Institute.

Life
Mary Willing Clymer was born Mary Willing on September 15, 1770, in Philadelphia, Pennsylvania, one of thirteen children born to parents Thomas Willing and Anne McCall. Her father was a former Mayor of Philadelphia (1763-64) and a Pennsylvania Supreme Court justice (1767-1777). He went on to become the president of the Bank of North America and First Bank of the United States after the American Revolution.

Mary wed Henry Clymer on July 9, 1794 and the couple had eight children. Henry was the son of George Clymer (1739–1813), who signed both the Declaration of Independence and the U.S. Constitution. Mary sat for a portrait by famed painter Gilbert Stuart in 1797. The portrait's caption notes that she was, "one of Philadelphia's premier social figures during the era when the city was the nation's capital".

She is buried at Friends Burying Ground in Mercer County, Trenton, New Jersey along with her husband.

Notes

Sources
ancestry.com Burnell, Jim George Clymer the Signer (accessed 16 October 2011) 
Biographical Directory of the United States Congress Clymer, George (accessed 16 October 2011)
Independence National Historical Park portrait gallery

People of colonial Pennsylvania
People from Philadelphia
1770 births
1852 deaths
Burials in New Jersey